Zhao Jingbo (born October 1964) is a former Chinese politician who spent his entire career in northeast China's Jilin province. He was investigated by China's top anti-graft agency in April 2019. Previously he served as deputy secretary-general of Jilin Provincial People's Government, and before that, mayor and communist party secretary of Jilin City.

Biography
Zhao was born in Changchun, Jilin, in October 1964. 

He joined the Communist Party of China (CPC) in December 1994. In 2000, he served in Jilin Provincial Department of Communications for eight years before becoming vice mayor of Jilin City in June 2008. In April 2011, he was named acting mayor of Jilin City, succeeding . He was installed as mayor in January 2012. In December 2014, he was promoted to party chief of the city. It would be his first job as "first-in-charge" of a city. In April 2017, he was appointed deputy secretary-general of Jilin Provincial People's Government, and held that office until July 2017.

Downfall
On 15 April 2019, he was put under investigation for alleged "serious violations of discipline and laws" by the Central Commission for Discipline Inspection (CCDI), the party's internal disciplinary body, and the National Supervisory Commission, the highest anti-corruption agency of China. Four party secretaries of Jilin City, namely Zhou Huachen, Xu Jianyi and Tian Xueren, were also sacked for graft. On October 9, he was expelled from the Communist Party and removed from public office. On November 21, he was indicted on suspicion of accepting bribes.

On 15 October 2021, he stood trial at the Intermediate People's Court of Baishan on charges of taking bribes. He was charged with accepting money and property worth over 63.59 million ($ million) personally or through his family members. According to the indictment, he allegedly took advantage of his positions to seek benefits for others in enterprise operation, project construction, project contracting and job adjustment between 2000 and 2018. He received a sentence of 15 years in prison and fine of 5 million yuan for taking bribes.

References

1964 births
Living people
People from Changchun
People's Republic of China politicians from Jilin
Chinese Communist Party politicians from Jilin